The 1929 Baden state election was held on 27 October 1929 to elect the 88 members of the Landtag of the Republic of Baden.

Results

References 

1929 elections in Germany
1929